Amit Singh Bakhshi (born 17 September 1925) is an Indian former hockey player. He was part of the Indian hockey team that won the gold medal in 1956 Summer Olympics at Melbourne.

References

External links

1925 births
Living people
Field hockey players at the 1956 Summer Olympics
Indian male field hockey players
Olympic field hockey players of India
Olympic gold medalists for India
Olympic medalists in field hockey
Medalists at the 1956 Summer Olympics